Flame of Youth is a 1949 American drama film directed by R. G. Springsteen and written by Robert Libott and Frank Burt. The film stars Barbra Fuller, Ray McDonald, Danny Sue Nolan, Tony Barrett, Carol Brannon and Anita Carrell. The film was released on September 22, 1949, by Republic Pictures.

Plot

After his daughter, nicknamed Jerry, is arrested for stealing hubcaps off cars, naive George Briggs picks her up at jail. She immediately goes to gangster Cicero Coletti to get her cut of the stolen loot, quarreling with Coletti's sister, Lila.

Jerry pays her dad's tab when bookie Deke Edwards demands he pay up or else. She ignores sister Catherine's pleas to get out of petty crime and concentrate on becoming a fashion model instead. Instead, she tries to rob the cash from a junkyard, as does Lila, who is shot by the owner. Jerry escapes, ripping her pants on a wire fence.

Catherine repays the stolen loot to the junkyard's owner, but George inadvertently identifies the torn pants as hers when the police come to investigate. Catherine and Jerry are both placed under arrest. Deke shoots an innocent friend of Jerry, who finally sees the error of her ways as she is taken to jail.

Cast    
Barbra Fuller as Lila Coletti
Ray McDonald as Bill Crawford
Danny Sue Nolan as Geraldine 'Jerry' Briggs 
Tony Barrett as Deke Edwards
Carol Brannon as Catherine Briggs 
Anita Carrell as Barb Spranklin
Michael Carr as Cicero Coletti
Don Beddoe as George Briggs
Denver Pyle as Lytz
Willard Waterman as Steve Miller
Arthur Walsh as Hector
Sally Forrest as Miss O'Brien 
Audrey Farr as Waitress
Maurice Doner as Loomis
Stephen Chase as Charles Howard
Charles Flynn as Jim Bennet

References

External links 
 

1949 films
American drama films
1949 drama films
Republic Pictures films
Films directed by R. G. Springsteen
American black-and-white films
1940s English-language films
1940s American films